Minthea rugicollis, the hairy powderpost beetle, is a species of powder-post beetle in the family Bostrichidae. It is found in the Caribbean, Oceania, Southern Asia, and Europe.

References

Further reading

External links

 

Bostrichidae
Articles created by Qbugbot
Beetles described in 1858